Clinton Renard "Mikki" Moore (pronounced "MY-key"; born November 4, 1975) is an American former professional basketball player.

Early life and college
Born in Orangeburg, South Carolina, Moore graduated from Blacksburg High School at Blacksburg, South Carolina in 1993.

Moore played at the University of Nebraska-Lincoln. He averaged 8.6 ppg (.553 FG%, .250 3pt%, .655 FT%), 5.8 rpg, and 2.10 bpg in 25.0 mpg in 114 games in four seasons at Nebraska (1993–1997). He ranks second in Cornhusker history in career blocked shots (236), trailing only Venson Hamilton (241), while also ranking seventh in school annals in career field goal percentage. Posted 11.7 ppg (.583 FG%, 1-2 3pt, .701 FT%), 7.4 rpg, 1.3 apg, and 2.67 bpg in 33 contests as a senior (1996–97), ranking second on the team in scoring and rebounding. He helped Nebraska to the school's first basketball championship of any kind as a junior in 1995-96, registering 11 points (4-9 FG, 3-5 FT), a game-high 13 rebounds, and one block in a 60-56 win vs. St. Joseph's in the 1996 NIT title game. Mikki was also known to be an excellent hacky-sack player, and would routinely join hack-circles outside of the Harper-Schramm-Smith Residence Hall.

Professional career
Moore went undrafted following a career at the University of Nebraska-Lincoln, where he left as the all-time leader in blocked shots. He is a journeyman player, having played for nine different NBA teams (Detroit Pistons, Atlanta Hawks, Boston Celtics, New Jersey Nets, Utah Jazz, Los Angeles Clippers, Seattle SuperSonics, Sacramento Kings, Golden State Warriors). He has also had stints playing overseas as well as other professional leagues in the U.S. such as the Continental Basketball Association and the NBA Development League, where he played for the Roanoke Dazzle. He was drafted 1st overall by Roanoke Dazzle in the 2002 NBA D-League Draft. Most notably, he enjoyed All-NBA D-League First Team and NBA D-League Defensive Player of the Year honors during the 2002–03 season. Moore was selected to the CBA All-Rookie Team in 1998, and the All-CBA First Team and All-Defensive Team in 1999.

New Jersey Nets (2006–2007)
On July 27, 2006, Moore was traded by the Sonics to the New Jersey Nets in exchange for a 2009 2nd round pick (Derrick Brown was selected with the pick). Following a season-ending ACL injury to center Nenad Krstić, Moore was called upon to play major minutes and had one of the best years of his NBA career, averaging career highs of 9.8 points per game and 5.1 rebounds per game, plus a league-leading .609 field goal percentage, becoming the first undrafted player ever to lead the NBA in field goal percentage, and only the third to finish in the top five since the 1976–77 season.

Sacramento Kings (2007–2009)
On July 21, 2007, Moore signed a multi-year deal with the Sacramento Kings. On February 19, 2009, he was waived by the Kings.

Boston Celtics (2009)
On February 24, 2009, he signed with the Boston Celtics.

Golden State Warriors (2009–2010)
On September 2, 2009, Moore signed with the Golden State Warriors to a reported one-year, $1.3 million deal. On January 4, 2010, after undergoing surgery for a bone spur in his right heel, Moore was waived by the Warriors.

Memphis Grizzlies (2011)
On December 9, 2011, he signed with the Memphis Grizzlies. However, he was waived on December 16.

Idaho Stampede (2012)
In January 2012, he was acquired by the Idaho Stampede.

Golden State Warriors (2012)
On April 16, 2012, he re-signed with the Warriors for the rest of the 2011–12 season.

Philadelphia 76ers (2012)
On October 1, 2012, he was signed with the Philadelphia 76ers. However, he was waived on October 10.

NBA D-League (2013)
On November 1, 2013, he was re-acquired by the Idaho Stampede. On November 4, 2013, he was traded to the Reno Bighorns. On December 19, 2013, he was waived by the Bighorns.

NBA career statistics

Regular season 

|-
| align="left" | 
| align="left" | Detroit
| 2 || 0 || 3.0 || 1.000 || .000 || 1.000 || .5 || .0 || .0 || .0 || 2.0
|-
| align="left" | 
| align="left" | Detroit
| 29 || 0 || 16.8 || .621 || .000 || .794 || 3.9 || .6 || .3 || 1.1 || 7.9
|-
| align="left" | 
| align="left" | Detroit
| 81 || 2 || 14.2 || .493 || .000 || .731 || 3.9 || .4 || .3 || .8 || 4.4
|-
| align="left" | 
| align="left" | Detroit
| 30 || 0 || 7.2 || .475 || .500 || .769 || 1.8 || .4 || .2 || .3 || 2.6
|-
| align="left" | 
| align="left" | Boston
| 3 || 0 || 4.0 || .000 || .000 || .000 || .3 || .0 || .0 || .7 || .0
|-
| align="left" | 
| align="left" | Atlanta
| 5 || 0 || 6.2 || .417 || .000 || .800 || 1.4 || .6 || .0 || .4 || 3.6
|-
| align="left" | 
| align="left" | New Jersey
| 4 || 0 || 2.5 || .200 || .000 || .000 || .5 || .0 || .0 || .0 || .5
|-
| align="left" | 
| align="left" | Utah
| 28 || 0 || 13.8 || .521 || .000 || .857 || 2.9 || .7 || .3 || .5 || 4.6
|-
| align="left" | 
| align="left" | L.A. Clippers
| 74 || 4 || 15.9 || .502 || .200 || .787 || 3.3 || .6 || .3 || .4 || 5.4
|-
| align="left" | 
| align="left" | Seattle
| 47 || 1 || 12.4 || .435 || .000 || .742 || 2.8 || .6 || .1 || .3 || 3.3
|-
| align="left" | 
| align="left" | New Jersey
| 79 || 55 || 26.4 || style="background:#cfecec;"| .609* || .000 || .681 || 5.1 || .9 || .6 || .8 || 9.8
|-
| align="left" | 
| align="left" | Sacramento
| 82 || 79 || 29.1 || .577 || .000 || .736 || 6.0 || 1.0 || .4 || .6 || 8.5
|-
| align="left" | 
| align="left" | Sacramento
| 46 || 20 || 16.2 || .521 || .000 || .810 || 3.3 || .6 || .3 || .3 || 3.5
|-
| align="left" | 
| align="left" | Boston
| 24 || 0 || 19.0 || .600 || .000 || .737 || 4.4 || 1.0 || .2 || .2 || 4.8
|-
| align="left" | 
| align="left" | Golden State
| 23 || 20 || 17.7 || .600 || .000 || .636 || 3.0 || 1.6 || .2 || .6 || 5.0
|-
| align="left" | 
| align="left" | Golden State
| 7 || 0 || 16.9 || .450 || .000 || .857 || 3.1 || .7 || .4 || .4 || 3.4
|- class="sortbottom"
| style="text-align:center;" colspan="2"| Career
| 564 || 181 || 18.2 || .551 || .154 || .743 || 3.9 || .7 || .3 || .5 || 5.8

Playoffs 

|-
| align="left" | 2000
| align="left" | Detroit
| 3 || 0 || 14.0 || .417 || .000 || 1.000 || 4.0 || 1.0 || .3 || .0 || 6.0
|-
| align="left" | 2007
| align="left" | New Jersey
| 12 || 12 || 33.3 || .560 || .000 || .793 || 5.6 || 1.2 || .8 || .6 || 11.3
|-
| align="left" | 2009
| align="left" | Boston
| 10 || 0 || 6.6 || .500 || .000 || .833 || 1.5 || .4 || .2 || .5 || 1.5
|- class="sortbottom"
| style="text-align:center;" colspan="2"| Career
| 25 || 12 || 20.3 || .541 || .000 || .837 || 3.8 || .8 || .5 || .5 || 6.7

References

External links

Profile at Eurobasket.com

1975 births
Living people
African-American basketball players
American expatriate basketball people in Greece
American men's basketball players
Atlanta Hawks players
Basketball players at the 1999 Pan American Games
Basketball players from South Carolina
Boston Celtics players
Centers (basketball)
Detroit Pistons players
Fort Wayne Fury players
Golden State Warriors players
Greek Basket League players
Idaho Stampede players
Los Angeles Clippers players
Nebraska Cornhuskers men's basketball players
New Jersey Nets players
Pan American Games medalists in basketball
Pan American Games silver medalists for the United States
Papagou B.C. players
People from Cherokee County, South Carolina
People from Orangeburg, South Carolina
Power forwards (basketball)
Reno Bighorns players
Roanoke Dazzle players
Sacramento Kings players
Seattle SuperSonics players
Undrafted National Basketball Association players
Utah Jazz players
United States Basketball League players
Medalists at the 1999 Pan American Games
21st-century African-American sportspeople
20th-century African-American sportspeople